Cosimo Fanzago (Clusone, 12 October 1591 – Napoli, 13 February 1678) was an Italian architect and sculptor, generally considered the greatest such artist of the Baroque period in Naples, Italy.

Biography
Fanzago was born in Clusone (current Province of Bergamo) in a family of bronze-casters and architects. In 1608, after a short stay in Chieti, he moved to Naples. Here (according to what he wrote in 1612) he trained as a marble sculptor (maestro di scultura di marmo) and mason under the Tuscan sculptor Angelo Landi. His first important work was the sepulchre monument of Mario Carafa, a relative of Cardinal Carafa. His architectural debut was the design of San Giuseppe dei Vecchi a San Potito (completed 1669).

According to an essay about Fanzago's life by count Fogaccia, in Naples he obtained the support of the Benedictines, the Viceroy Duke of Medina, Prince Caracciolo and the Carthusians, and soon opened a workshop of his own.

Apparently he sympathised with Masaniello's revolt, and after the return of Royal authority, Fanzago was sentenced to death and had to flee to Rome, where he worked for a decade. He returned to Naples and designed the initial layout church of Santa Maria Egiziaca a Pizzofalcone (built 1651–1717). This church displays a Greek cross plan, and resembles a hybrid of contemporary Baroque masterpieces by Bernini (dome resembles Sant'Andrea al Quirinale) and Borromini (the plan resembles Sant'Agnese). 

He also designed the church of Santa Teresa a Chiaia. His last great church was Santa Maria Maggiore, built between 1653 and 1675. Fanzago died at an age of 87 years. One of his pupils was Lorenzo Vaccaro.

Main works in Naples

His works in Naples include:
Guglia di San Gennaro: a votive spire in honor of the patron saint of Naples. It imitates the large portable ephemeral decorations common in religious processions
model for two other prominent spires, which he helped plan (at the Piazza del Gesù Nuovo and  the Piazza San Domenico Maggiore). It was a so-called "plague column"; that is, a spire built in thanks for having been spared from the recent epidemic.

 

Extensive work on the Certosa di San Martino, including the spectacular central courtyard with its large portals and busts of Carthusian saints. The church and cloisters are considered to be his masterpiece. The Carthusians paid Fanzago 57,000 ducats over 33 years of work. Between 1660 and 1700, a lawsuit alleging underpayment by the monks wound its way through the Neapolitan courts.
The Cacace Chapel and Chapel of Saint Anthony in San Lorenzo Maggiore.
Altars within churches, such as in Santa Maria la Nova, Santi Severino e Sossio,  Santa Maria di Costantinopoli, and the church of San Pietro a Maiella (the site now of the music conservatory).
Public fountains, including the Fontana del Gigante near Santa Lucia and the Sebeto Fountain at Mergellina.
Villa Donn'Anna at Posillipo.
A number of works outside of Naples, including within the Benedictine Abbey of Montecassino and San Nicola in Venice.

References

External links
  Web Gallery of Art
Jusepe de Ribera, 1591-1652, a full text exhibition catalog from The Metropolitan Museum of Art, which includes material on Cosimo Fanzago (see index)

1591 births
1678 deaths
17th-century Italian architects
Architects from Naples
People from Clusone
17th-century Italian sculptors
Italian male sculptors
Catholic sculptors